KXSS-FM (96.9 FM, "96-9 KISS-FM") is a Top 40 (CHR) formatted radio station serving the Amarillo, Texas, market. KXSS-FM is owned by Townsquare Media. Its studios are located on Southwest 34th Avenue in Southwest Amarillo, and its transmitter tower is based north of the city on the property of unrelated television station KFDA-TV in unincorporated Potter County.

The 96.9 frequency was, until 2008, home to a country music format as "96.9 KMML," under the ownership of Clear Channel Communications; however, it was one of close to 450 radio stations sold by Clear Channel in the process of privatization, beginning in 2007. KXSS, along with its sister stations KPRF-FM, KATP-FM, KMXJ-FM, and KIXZ, was acquired along with approximately fifty other stations by Gap Broadcasting for a total price of $139M. What eventually became Gap Central Broadcasting (following the formation of GapWest Broadcasting) was folded into Townsquare Media on August 13, 2010.

The KMML call sign has been reissued to a radio station in Cimarron, Kansas.

References

External links

XSS-FM
Radio stations established in 1972
Contemporary hit radio stations in the United States
Townsquare Media radio stations